The Delaware and Raritan River Railroad  is a short-line railroad that operates two lines in the central part of the U.S. state of New Jersey. The Southern Secondary runs from an interchange with Conrail Shared Assets Operations (CSAO) in Red Bank south to Lakewood. The Freehold Secondary runs from an interchange with CSAO in Jamesburg southeast to Freehold. The Delaware and Raritan River Railroad is a subsidiary of Chesapeake and Delaware, LLC. In 2022, Chesapeake and Delaware, LLC filed to take over rail service from CSAO on the Southern Secondary and Freehold Secondary, portions of which are owned by CSAO and NJ Transit. The Delaware and Raritan River Railroad began operations on July 1, 2022.

References

External links

Official website

New Jersey railroads
Railway companies established in 2022
Spin-offs of Conrail
2022 establishments in New Jersey